Todd Franklin Collins (born May 27, 1970) is a former National Football League linebacker. He started for the New England Patriots in Super Bowl XXXI, and Super Bowl XXXIV for the Rams.

Collins was a champion in high school and college football. He led Jefferson County High School to the 1987 TSSAA AAA State Championship. Coming out of Jefferson County, Collins was a USA Today High School All-American. He received a scholarship to the University of Georgia but injury problems kept him off the field, and he transferred to the University of Tennessee for one semester. He then ended up at Carson-Newman College, whom he led to the 1989 NAIA National Championship.

Collins was drafted by the New England Patriots in the 3rd round of the 1992 NFL Draft. He left the Patriots for the Rams in 1999. Part of the compensation package the Patriots received from Rams included the 199th pick in the 2000 NFL draft, which the Patriots used to draft Tom Brady.

References

1970 births
Living people
American football linebackers
Carson–Newman Eagles football players
New England Patriots players
St. Louis Rams players
People from New Market, Tennessee
Players of American football from Tennessee